Consolato del Mare may refer to:

Book of the Consulate of the Sea, medieval maritime laws
Banca Giuratale (Valletta), a building in Malta also called Consolato del Mare